Infāq is an Arabic word meaning spending, disbursement. but also carries the sense of doing so simply to please God without asking for any favor or hoping for a return. 

The word ʾinfāq is mentioned once in the Qurʾān in Q17:100. The imperative form of the verb  (ʾanfiqū) (أَنفِقُوا) appears 18 times in the Qurʾān  Similar wording is found at Q8:3; Q14:31; Q22:35; Q28:54; Q32:16.

Infāq  is different from zakat, which is obligatory on Muslims, or sadaqah, which is charity for obtaining specific return or protection from some adverse event.

References 

Islamic terminology